Heydarabad (also Romanized as Ḩeydarābād) is a village in Binalud Rural District, in the Central District of Nishapur County, Razavi Khorasan Province, Iran. At the 2006 census, its population was 154, in 28 families.

References 

Populated places in Nishapur County